Events from the year 1741 in Scotland.

Incumbents 

 Secretary of State for Scotland: vacant

Law officers 
 Lord Advocate – Charles Erskine
 Solicitor General for Scotland – William Grant of Prestongrange

Judiciary 
 Lord President of the Court of Session – Lord Culloden
 Lord Justice General – Lord Ilay
 Lord Justice Clerk – Lord Milton

Events 
 17 May – George Watson's College opens in Edinburgh as George Watson's Hospital.
 Royal Infirmary of Edinburgh moves to a new building designed by William Adam.
 Robert Foulis sets up a publishing business in Glasgow.
 Leadhills Miners' Library set up.
 Earliest known record of the Royal Order of Scotland within British Freemasonry.
 47th (Lancashire) Regiment of Foot raised in Scotland as General John Mordaunt's Regiment of Foot.

Births 
 2 March – James Stuart, British Army officer, commander-in-chief of the Madras Army (died 1815 in England)
 23 August – James Hope-Johnstone, 3rd Earl of Hopetoun (died 1816)
 25 August – Henry Hunter, Presbyterian minister and translator (died 1802 in England)
 James Moncrief, military engineer (died of wounds 1793 in Flanders)
 William Russell, writer (died 1793)

Deaths 
 18 March – Thomas Gordon, commodore in the Royal Scots Navy and admiral in the Imperial Russian Navy (born c. 1658; died in Russia)
 November – John Ker, academic and Latin poet

See also 

 Timeline of Scottish history

References 

 
Years of the 18th century in Scotland
Scotland
1740s in Scotland